François Zahoui (born 21 July 1961) is an Ivorian football former player and manager who manages the Central African Republic national team. He was the first African footballer to play in Serie A.

Coaching career
In 2010, Zahoui was chosen to succeed Sven-Goran Eriksson as head coach of the full Ivory Coast national team.

In 2015, he was appointed as the head coach of Niger, leaving in September 2019.

A week later he became manager of Central African Republic.

References

External links 
François Zahoui, l'itinéraire d'un enfant du pays

AS Nancy profile

1961 births
Living people
Footballers from Abidjan
Ivorian footballers
Ivorian expatriate footballers
Ivory Coast international footballers
Ascoli Calcio 1898 F.C. players
Serie A players
AS Nancy Lorraine players
SC Toulon players
Ligue 1 players
Expatriate footballers in France
Expatriate footballers in Italy
Ivorian expatriate sportspeople in France
Ivorian expatriate sportspeople in Italy
Ivorian football managers
1984 African Cup of Nations players
1986 African Cup of Nations players
1988 African Cup of Nations players
Ivory Coast national football team managers
Niger national football team managers
Central African Republic national football team managers
2012 Africa Cup of Nations managers
Ivorian expatriate football managers
Ivorian expatriate sportspeople in Niger
Expatriate football managers in Niger
Ivorian expatriate sportspeople in the Central African Republic
Expatriate football managers in the Central African Republic